Jarkko Tapola (born 5 May 1944) is a Finnish former sprinter who participated in world athletics for Finland in the late 1960s and 1970s. He competed in the 60 metres and won a bronze medal in Vienna at the 1970 European Indoor Championships in Athletics, behind winner Valeriy Borzov and Zenon Nowosz who finished in second place.

References 

Finnish male sprinters
1944 births
Living people
Place of birth missing (living people)